Thomas Hore (died 1406) was an English MP for Wells, Somerset September 1388 and 1394.

References

14th-century births
English MPs September 1388
1406 deaths
English MPs 1394